Gardham or Low Gardham is a small hamlet in the East Riding of Yorkshire, England.

Gardham forms part of the civil parish of Cherry Burton.

References

External links

Hamlets in the East Riding of Yorkshire